DXKS may refer to:
 DXKS-AM, an AM radio station broadcasting in Surigao City, branded as Radyo Ronda
 DXKS-FM (CDO), an FM radio station broadcasting in Cagayan de Oro, branded as Easy Rock
 DXKS-FM (Tagum), an FM radio station broadcasting in Tagum, branded as Energy FM